Limetown is an American drama series, based on the podcast of the same name created by Zack Akers and Skip Bronkie, that premiered on Facebook Watch on October 16, 2019. The series stars Jessica Biel and Stanley Tucci.

On January 16, 2020, Facebook Watch canceled the series after one season.

Premise
Limetown follows Lia Haddock, a journalist for American Public Radio (APR), as she unravels the mystery behind the disappearance of over 300 people at a neuroscience research facility in Tennessee.

Cast and characters

Main characters

 Jessica Biel as Lia Haddock
 Stanley Tucci as Emile Haddock/"The man we were all there for"

Recurring and Guest characters

 Sherri Saum as Gina Purri
 Alexander Black as Mark Green
 Alessandro Juliani as Dr. Oskar Totem
 Louis Ferreira as Dr. Max Finlayson
 Vera Frederickson as Young Lia
 Janet Kidder as Lenore Dougal
 Kandyse McClure as Lia's girlfriend
 Rekha Sharma as Special Agent Siddiqui
 Kelly Jenrette as Winona / Cyndi Walter
 Kelly Metzger as Meryl
 Marlee Matlin as Deirdre Wells
 Mingzhu Ye as Sylvia
 Èanna O'Dowd as Spencer
 Daniel Bacon as Karl Walter
 Sheryl Lee as Alison Haddock
 David Bloom as Harvey
 Tony Bailey as Daniel
 Harnoor Gill as Frankie
 Hiro Kanagawa as Reynaud Bram Villard
 John Beasley as Reverend Warren Chambers
 Chris Shields as Ron Calhoun
 Jason Tremblay as Young Jacob Haddock
 Ben Cotton as Terry Hilkins

Episodes

Production

Development
On October 8, 2018, it was announced that Facebook had given a series order to a television series adaptation of Zack Akers and Skip Bronkie's podcast Limetown, for a first season comprising 10 episodes. Akers and Bronkie were expected to write the series and serve as executive producers alongside Jessica Biel, Michelle Purple, Josh Appelbaum, André Nemec, Jeff Pinkner, Scott Rosenberg, and Adrienne Erickson. Production companies involved with the series were slated to include Iron Ocean Productions, Endeavor Content, and Midnight Radio.

Casting
Alongside the series order announcement, it was confirmed that Jessica Biel would star in the series. On December 6, 2018, it was announced that Stanley Tucci had been cast in a series regular role and that Marlee Matlin, Kelly Jenrette, John Beasley, and Louis Ferreira would appear in a recurring capacity. On January 12, 2019, it was announced that Sherri Saum had joined the series in a recurring role. On February 26, 2019, it was reported that Rekha Sharma has joined the cast in a recurring capacity.

Filming
Principal photography for the series was scheduled to last from December 5, 2018 to March 16, 2019 in Vancouver, British Columbia, Canada.

Release
In advance of its broadcast premiere, several episodes of the series received a preview screening in the Primetime program of the 2019 Toronto International Film Festival.

Reception
On Rotten Tomatoes the series has an approval rating of  69% based on reviews from 13 critics. The site's critical consensus is: "Guided by an excellent turn from Jessica Biel, Limetown sustains an impressively creeping atmosphere that makes up for its occasionally fuzzy plotting." On Metacritic it has a score of 62 out of 100 based on reviews from 8 critics, indicating "generally favorable reviews".

See also
 List of podcast adaptations

References

External links
 
 

2019 American television series debuts
2019 American television series endings
2010s American drama television series
2010s American LGBT-related drama television series
2010s American mystery television series
American drama web series
American LGBT-related web series
English-language television shows
Lesbian-related television shows
Television shows based on podcasts
Television shows set in Tennessee